Owen M. Seyler is a former game designer who worked primarily on role-playing games.

Career
Owen Seyler and Christian Moore were recent college graduates when they were rooming together in 1994. Moore and Seyler formed the game company Last Unicorn Games with Greg Ormand and Bernie Cahill to publish a game that Moore was working on, Aria: Canticle of the Monomyth (1994). Moore, Seyler, and new employee Ross Isaacs did the initial work on the "Icon" system for the Star Trek: The Next Generation Role-playing Game (1998). Moore was an old friend of Peter Adkison, and when Last Unicorn was having financial troubles, Wizards of the Coast purchased the company in July 2000. Seyler still worked at Last Unicorn when Decipher, Inc. purchased the company in 2001. Moore and Seyler later got jobs at Upper Deck.

After leaving the gaming industry, he became an event planner.

References

External links
 

Living people
Role-playing game designers
Year of birth missing (living people)